The 1951–52 National Football League was the 21st staging of the National Football League (NFL), an annual Gaelic football tournament for the Gaelic Athletic Association county teams of Ireland.

Cork beat Dublin in the home final and easily dismissed New York in the Polo Grounds final, played at night under floodlights. New York didn't return to the final until 1963.

Format 
Teams are placed into Divisions I, II, III and IV. The top team in each division reaches the home semi-finals. The winner of the home final plays  in the NFL final.

Results

Division I

Division II

Division III

Division IV

Finals

References

National Football League
National Football League
National Football League (Ireland) seasons